Mohani Mandal or Mohni Modol is a village in Suppi Tehsil in the Sitamarhi district of Bihar, India. It is located 16 km towards west from the district headquarter, 3 km from Suppi, and 141 km from state capital Patna. Mohani Mandal has a total population of 12,043 people. There are about 2,802 houses. Its postal head office is Riga. Ratanpur, Babhangama, Sasaula, Kothia Rai, Harpur Pipra are the nearby villages to Mohani Mandal. Mohani Mandal is surrounded by Majorganj Block towards North, Riga Block towards South, Bairgania Block towards west, Purnahiya Block towards west.

The nearest town to Mohani Mandal is Sitamarhi which is approximately 16 km away.

Population 
Total Population of this village is 12,043. Male population is 6,383 and Female population is 5,660.

Demographics 
Maithili is spoken by most of the people.

Educational institutes 

 Pandit Deen Dyal Upadhaya College
 Priya Rani Rai Degree College
 Jawahar Lal Nehru Memorial College
 Sri R.B.P.I College, Bairgania
 Priti Mishra Group of Institutions
 Bhawani Bhawan Sanskrit School
 M.s. Akhta U.p.s. Mohni Khurd
 U.P.S. Jamla Parsa

Nearby airports 

 Patna Airport- 139 km
 Gorakhpur Airport- 216 km
 Gaya Airport- 245 km
 Varanasi Airport- 322 km

References 

Villages in Sitamarhi district